Callington is a small town on the eastern slopes of the Adelaide Hills, in South Australia. Callington is situated on the Bremer River, and is adjacent to the South Eastern Freeway and the Adelaide-Wolseley railway line, however no trains have stopped at the station for many years. Callington is located within the state electoral district of Kavel and the federal division of Mayo.

History 
Callington was surveyed in 1848, at which time John Kiernan noticed copper in the rocks. Callington was named after the copper mining town Callington in Cornwall, UK. The Callington Inn opened in 1851. Little copper was mined at first, before the miners followed the Victorian gold rush. Mining restarted a few years later in the Bremer Mine, digging the lode down until the water table was reached. In 1857 a forty-inch steam engine was installed to pump out  of water per day. An even bigger pump was brought from Hallett Cove in 1859. In 1860–61, 150 workers were mining 250-300 tons of ore a month, which was smelted at Callington. Despite some good years, the Bremer Mine eventually fell into liquidation in 1870 due to low copper prices.

Demographics 

According to the 2006 census, Callington had 387 residents, almost half aged 25–54 years, and the median age was 34. Almost 90% of them were born in Australia.

Recreation 
Callington is home to the Bremer Callington Cricket Club which plays in the Alexandra and Eastern Hills Cricket Association since the merger of the Bremer Cricket Club and the Callington Cricket Club in 1970. The Bridgewater Callington Raiders plays Australian rules football home matches at both Bridgewater and Callington in the Hills Football League.

Education 
Callington has a kindergarten and a primary school in the town. Students need to travel to Mount Barker, Strathalbyn or Murray Bridge for high school.

See also
List of cities and towns in South Australia

References

External links 
 Google Map
 Map
 Callington Hub
 Callington South Australia
 Postcards – Previous feature: Callington
 Callington Weather
 Callington Show
 Callington Cemetery headstone transcriptions

Cornish-Australian culture
Mining towns in South Australia